Zalina (Macedonian and Serbian Cyrillic: Залина, Albanian: Zallinë) is a mountain peak located along the border of Kosovo and North Macedonia. Nearby is a small mountain lake.

References

Notes

Šar_Mountains
Two-thousanders of Kosovo
Two-thousanders of North Macedonia